The Taoist Temple at No. 12 China Alley in Hanford, in Kings County, California, dates from 1893.  It was listed on the U.S. National Register of Historic Places (NRHP) in 1972.

Background
It is historically significant as a surviving authentic structure from Hanford's Chinatown, after it moved to the 200-foot-long China Alley in the 1890s, after a fire in the previous Chinatown area.  China Alley served the second largest population of Chinese in the U.S., behind San Francisco.  The temple itself was argued in its NRHP nomination to be valuable "as an example of typical late 19th century indigenous construction, with oriental overtones.... in keeping with the theme of the original Hanford Chinese settlement and with the buildings still remaining."

The Taoist Temple Museum is open for tours once a month.

China Alley, where the temple is located, was listed as one of the 11 most endangered historic places in America in 2011 by the National Trust for Historic Preservation.

On the evening of May 12, 2021, the building was heavily damaged by fire. Although the building itself did not sustain structural damage, the fire still caused severe smoke and heat damage to the second-floor temple room and its artifacts, which will require significant clean up and conservation.

See also
 Temple of Kwan Tai (武帝廟) located in Mendocino, California
 Bok Kai Temple (北溪廟) located in the city of Marysville, California
 Kong Chow Temple (岡州古廟) located in San Francisco, California
 Tin How Temple (天后古廟) in San Francisco's Chinatown, California
 Oroville Chinese Temple (列聖宮) located in Oroville, California
 Weaverville Joss House (雲林廟), located in the center of the town of Weaverville, California
 Imperial Dynasty restaurant

References

External links
 China Alley Historic District website — tours of the Taoist Temple Museum.

Hanford, California
Chinese-American museums in California
Hanford, California
Museums in Kings County, California
Chinese-American culture in California
Temples in California
Religious buildings and structures completed in 1893
National Register of Historic Places in Kings County, California
Properties of religious function on the National Register of Historic Places in California
1893 establishments in California
Buildings and structures in Kings County, California